David John Giusti, Jr. (born November 27, 1939) is an American former professional baseball player.

Early life
While playing baseball for Syracuse University, Giusti pitched in the 1961 College World Series as a starting pitcher. He signed out of a college as a free agent with the Houston Colt .45s (later the Houston Astros), and played in Houston from 1962–68. Shortly before the 1968 expansion draft, Giusti was traded to the St. Louis Cardinals, who left him unprotected, and he was then drafted by the San Diego Padres. Two months later, Giusti was then traded back to the Cardinals. He competed for the fifth starter's role in spring training but lost out to Mike Torrez.

After the 1969 baseball season, Giusti was traded to the Pittsburgh Pirates. With the Pirates, he was converted into a relief pitcher by manager Danny Murtaugh, and Giusti soon became one of the leading relief pitchers in the National League. Using his sinking palmball heavily, Giusti recorded 20 or more saves in each of the next four baseball seasons, and he led the National League with 30 saves in 1971 for the Pirates. Giusti appeared in three games for Pittsburgh in the 1971 World Series, earning a save in Game Four. Giusti was awarded The Sporting News Reliever of the Year Award in 1971.

In 1973, Giusti was selected for the National League's All-Star Team. Giusti pitched a one-two-three seventh inning as the National League won the game 7–1.

Shortly before the beginning of the 1977 season, he was traded to the Oakland Athletics as part of a ten-player trade – one that also sent Tony Armas, Rick Langford, Doug Bair, Doc Medich and Mitchell Page to the Oakland Athletics and sent Phil Garner, Chris Batton, and Tommy Helms to Pittsburgh. In August, the Athletics sold Giusti's contract to the Chicago Cubs with whom Giusti finished the season, and after being released by the Cubs in November, Giusti retired from baseball.

Giusti's most valuable baseball pitch was his palmball.

Life Outside Baseball
After his baseball career, Giusti became a corporate sales manager for American Express. As of 2002, he is retired and living in Mt. Lebanon, Pennsylvania.

See also
 List of Major League Baseball annual saves leaders
 List of Major League Baseball leaders in games finished

References

External links

1939 births
Living people
Baseball players from New York (state)
People from Seneca Falls, New York
Chicago Cubs players
Houston Astros players
Houston Buffs players
Houston Colt .45s players
Jacksonville Jets players
Major League Baseball pitchers
National League All-Stars
National League saves champions
Oakland Athletics players
Oklahoma City 89ers players
Pittsburgh Pirates players
St. Louis Cardinals players
Syracuse Orange men's basketball players
Syracuse Orangemen baseball players
American men's basketball players
American people of Italian descent